Myrtle Grove Wildlife Management Area is a Wildlife Management Area in Charles County, Maryland.

External links
 Myrtle Grove Wildlife Management Area

Wildlife management areas of Maryland
Protected areas of Charles County, Maryland